BBC Alba is a Scottish Gaelic-language free-to-air public broadcast television channel jointly owned by the BBC and MG Alba. The channel was launched on 19 September 2008 and is on-air for up to seven hours a day with BBC Radio nan Gàidheal simulcasts. The name  is the Scottish Gaelic name for Scotland. The station is unique in that it is the first channel to be delivered under a BBC licence by a partnership and was also the first multi-genre channel to come entirely from Scotland with almost all of its programmes made in Scotland.

 BBC Alba had an average viewership of 637,000 adults over the age of 16 in Scotland each week.

History 

In 2007, the BBC Trust opened a consultation for a Gaelic digital service in partnership with the Gaelic Media Service. Following the BBC Trust consultation in November 2007, the Audience Council Scotland recommended their support for the creation of the service on 7 December 2007, stating that the Trust should pursue carriage of the service on digital terrestrial television and that the existing "Gaelic zone" programming on BBC Scotland should remain after the launch. On 28 January 2008, the BBC Trust gave the go-ahead for a Gaelic channel.

The channel began broadcasting on satellite at 9:00 pm on 19 September 2008 with a launch video featuring a new rendition of the Runrig song, . The first part of a live cèilidh from Skye, presented by Mary Ann Kennedy, was followed by a specially produced comedy-drama entitled  (Elvis), starring Greg Hemphill as Elvis Presley, at 9:30 pm. The channel's first independent commission,  (Peter Manuel - The End of Evil?), a drama-documentary produced by STV Productions, was shown at 10:30 pm before the opening night closed with the second half of the live cèilidh from Skye. The launch night was simulcast on BBC Two Scotland between 9:00 pm and 10:30 pm and a launch event was held at the National Museum of Scotland, which was recorded by the channel's news service .

A study carried out for the channel indicated that 650,000 people watched BBC Alba per week in the first two months of broadcasting, in spite of only being available to around a third of Scots. After being subject to a review by the BBC Trust and a recommendation from the Audience Council Scotland in 2009, a plan was announced to broadcast the channel on Freeview, in Scotland only, from the digital switchover (2010) under the proviso that reach of the service extended beyond the core Gaelic audience to 250,000. This was approved on 27 December 2010 by the BBC Trust and the service launched on Freeview on 8 June 2011. The channel also launched on Virgin Media (Scotland only) on 18 May 2011, and was made available nationwide on the Virgin Media and Sky platforms, the former on 6 November 2012.

Operation 

BBC Alba is broadcast for up to seven hours a day in the United Kingdom on satellite platforms Sky and Freesat, cable provider Virgin Media and on digital terrestrial provider Freeview in Scotland only.  BBC Alba simulcasts the BBC's Gaelic-language radio service BBC Radio nan Gàidheal as well during the day after midnight (1am on Saturday night), which in turn simulcasts BBC Radio Scotland overnight. Programmes are also available to watch on the Internet live through services including the BBC iPlayer and some programmes are available for 30 days after broadcast on this service and on catch up services of some other services. Unlike BBC Three and BBC Four. BBC Alba is an evenings only channel that doesn't start broadcasting at 7pm and doesn't timeshare with other channels. On 8 September, 2022. BBC Alba had to pause programming at around 6:30pm due to the death of Her Majesty Queen Elizabeth II. Normal programming resumed the following day at 7pm.

The channel is financed from the BBC Scotland budget and by MG Alba, which itself is financed by the Scottish Government and UK Government. The BBC spent £8 million on the channel, of which £5 million was used for programming, in 2011/12 MG Alba applies the majority of its budget (£12.4 million in 2008/09) to the Gaelic Digital Service.

BBC Alba continuity presentation and channel management is based in Stornoway, while the news services are based in Inverness. BBC Scotland's headquarters at Pacific Quay in Glasgow is used to transmit the programmes.

The BBC have confirmed that BBC Alba HD will launch online and on various platforms between October 2021 and the end of 2022.

Content 
BBC Alba combines television, radio and on-line programme content.  BBC Alba broadcasts more Scottish sport than any other channel, with over three hours a week of football, rugby and shinty. In addition, the station also broadcasts a live news programme every day, with the weekend news provision beginning in 2018.

Programming 
Output on the channel consists of news, current affairs, sport, drama, documentary, entertainment, education, religion and children's programming, broadcast on most days between 5 pm and 12 am.

Children's programmes are shown for two hours every weekday, between 17:00 and 19:00. Starting in 2018, a rebranding initiative saw the first hour presented as 'CBeebies Alba' and the second hour as 'CBBC Alba'. They are the Scottish Gaelic versions of the CBBC and CBeebies channels.

A nightly news programme, airs nightly throughout the week, usually in its regular slot of 8:00 pm. Saturday night features weekly coverage of a selected Scottish Premiership match and matches are regularly shown from the Scottish Women's Premier League and the friendlies and competitive matches involving the Scottish women's national football team.

Current programmes
 @12
 A' Chùil
 Aithne air Ainmhidhean
 An Là
 A-null's a-null
 Celtic League
 Danger Mouse (2015 TV series)
 Frauen-Bundesliga
 Kung Fu Panda: Legends of Awesomeness
Moominvalley (TV series)
 Paper Port (TV series)
 Peek Zoo
 Peppa Pig
 Pipas and Douglas
 Pompon Little Bear
 Saidheans Spòrsail
 Scottish Football League
 Scottish Football League First Division
 Scottish Junior Cup
 Scottish Premiership
 Scottish Women's Premier League
 The Adventures of Tintin (TV series)
 The Rubbish World of Dave Spud
 Thomas and Friends

Upcoming programmes
 My Little Heroes

Former programmes
 A'Gharaids
 Aifric
 Air an Rathad
 Alpha and Omega
 Alvinnn!!! and the Chipmunks
 Bannan (TV series)
 Big Barn Farm
 Bob The Builder
 Broadford or Bust
 Charlie and Lola
 Cuide ri Cathy
 Dragons: Race to the Edge
 Ealtainn
 Get Blake!
 Làrach anns an Fhàsach
 Lostbost
 Louie (French TV series)
 Meeow!
 Pimpa
 Scream Street (TV series)
 Seasaidh Lexy
 Slighe gu Biadh
 Squeak!
 Strange Hill High
 Tìr is Teanga

Subtitling 

Most of the adult programming on BBC Alba contains on-screen English subtitles. For logistical reasons, live broadcasts (including the news) are not subtitled, although certain events (e.g. the annual Hogmanay broadcast ) have scripted elements that are subtitled, while interviews and ad-libbed lines are not.

Children's programmes are not subtitled. Controversially, no English dialogue on the channel is subtitled into Scottish Gaelic.

Sport 

BBC Alba concentrates on four sports: football, rugby, shinty, and curling.

During the 2009–10 season, the station broadcast one full Scottish Premier League game every Saturday night. The game selected was always one not covered by either live Sky Sports or on an on-demand basis by BT Vision and was shown three hours after the end of the match. The matches only included Gaelic commentary along with English subtitles.

The channel reached an agreement with the Scottish Football League to broadcast live football games during the 2008–09 season. This began with the final of the Challenge Cup, which was also sponsored by MG Alba. BBC Alba then started broadcasting First Division games, beginning with the match between Airdrie United and Clyde on 22 February 2009.

BBC Alba also struck a deal with the Scottish rugby authorities to show one live rugby, Scottish Premiership Division One match every weekend.

For the 2015–16 season, BBC Alba will show 20 live matches (excluding Rangers) from either 2015-16 Scottish Championship (including the play-off final), League 1 or League 2 as well as four matches from the Scottish Challenge Cup. The station also altered their coverage of Scottish Premiership highlights, showing one hour highlights of two non-televised matches on a Saturday and Sunday night at 22:00. Other football coverage includes all Scotland U21s and Women's matches. As well as the final of the 2015-16 Scottish Junior Cup.

In 2010 BBC Alba bought the rights for Celtic League rugby jointly with public service broadcasters from the Republic of Ireland, Northern Ireland and Wales.

In May 2020, BBC Alba broadcast the last five matches of Women's Bundesliga.

Independent production companies 

A number of independent companies have been commissioned to produce content for the channel, or have productions currently airing.  These include:
 Theatre Hebrides
 Madmac Productions (Broadford or Bust)
 Caledonia Stern and Wylde
 MnE Media, formerly known as 
 Tern TV
 Eyeline Media
 MacTV
 Studio Alba
 Young Films (Bannan)

Criticism

English content and lack of Gaelic subtitles
The Gaelic community, including writers Aonghas MacNeacail, Angus Peter Campbell, Lisa Storey
 and musician Allan MacDonald, have criticised the non-availability of Gaelic subtitles, and the emphasis on English-language interviews and reportage in the channel's content for adults.  Writers and authors were reported by the BBC Gaelic news service as setting up a campaign, GAIDHLIG.TV, to increase Gaelic content on BBC Alba. The decision to introduce 'red button facilities' to allow viewers to switch to English-language sports commentary, first announced in August 2014 for rugby and the Guinness Pro12 series, was heavily criticised by the Gaelic community.  The criticism resulted in MG Alba announcing publicly in the West Highland Free Press that the 'red button option' for English-language commentary would not expand to other sports or areas of the channel.

Sports programming 

Between its launch in September 2008 and the beginning of 2010, the BBC Alba channel lost a third of its viewers, but its number of viewers remains five times larger than the size of the Gaelic speech community in Scotland (just over 58,000). The historian Michael Fry has argued that many of its viewers only watch it for the football coverage, because "you don't need Gaelic to watch football", and that in this way the channel is "cheating". The model is, however, both common and intentional as it is on comparable channels such as the Irish language channel TG4, the Basque broadcaster EITB or the Welsh channel S4C. In Europe, these channels' main mission is not commercial, but the promotion of the original languages.

Freeview 

Some criticism had been levied over the channel's addition to Freeview, primarily due to the BBC's original plan (with acceptance from the BBC Executive) to remove all 13 BBC Radio channels from Freeview for Scottish viewers over the period that BBC Alba will be shown on Freeview (between 5 pm and midnight); however the criticism has not been directed at the BBC's decision to extend BBC ALBA to Freeview in principle. On 19 May 2011, it was reported that the BBC has backed down on the plans, after the BBC had "managed to reengineer facilities" to allow BBC Radio 1Xtra, 5 Live and 6 Music to continue to broadcast on a 24-hour basis. The three stations were chosen because they have the highest evening audience ratings on digital television of the seven BBC radio stations unavailable on FM radio.
On 2 December 2013, it was confirmed that more radio stations were made available 24 hours in Scotland, but with some trade-offs. BBC Radio 4, 4 Extra, 5 Live Sports Extra, BBC Radio Scotland and BBC Asian Network were restored, but as noted in the blog with some technical trade-offs, such as mono audio rather than stereo during the evenings on the radio stations mentioned and the audio bit rate of the TV channels in Scotland on Freeview reduced to 192 kbit/s from 256 kbit/s.

See also 

 List of television stations in the United Kingdom
 
 List of Celtic-language media
 Celtic Media Festival
  – Gaelic-language channel, previously available on Freeview, that was closed at digital switchover.
 Māori Television
 NRK Sámi Radio

Notes

References

External links 
 
 

2008 establishments in Scotland
BBC television channels in the United Kingdom
Scottish Gaelic mass media
Television channels and stations established in 2008
Television channels in Scotland
Television in minority languages
BBC Scotland